, there were about 1,950 electric vehicles in Louisiana, equivalent to 0.05% of all vehicles in the state.

Government policy
, the state government offers tax rebates of up to $2,500 for electric vehicle purchases.

In June 2022, the state government introduced an annual registration fee of $110 for electric vehicles.

Charging stations
, there were 141 public charging station ports in Louisiana. , there were 12 public DC charging stations in Louisiana.

The Infrastructure Investment and Jobs Act, signed into law in November 2021, allocates  to charging stations in Louisiana.

By region

Alexandria
, there were 38 electric vehicles registered in Rapides Parish, and none registered in Grant Parish.

, there were 2 public charging stations in Alexandria.

Baton Rouge
, there were 48 public charging stations in Baton Rouge.

Lafayette
The first public charging stations in Lafayette opened in July 2019.

Monroe
, there was one public charging station in Monroe.

New Orleans
In 2022, the New Orleans city council unanimously passed an ordinance requiring that the city's light-duty vehicle fleet be transitioned entirely to electric by 2025.

References

Louisiana
Road transportation in Louisiana